Rashid Taan Kazem al-Azzawi is a prominent leader in the Ba'ath Party, where he held the position of official of the party's organizations in Anbar Governorate and the position of Governor of Anbar during the era of former President Saddam Hussein. He was elected as a member of the party's regional leadership in 2001.

Rashid Taan was born in a village near Muqdadiya in Diyala Governorate.

After the 2003 U.S. invasion
He was on the list of the most wanted faces of the Iraqi regime during the occupation of Iraq. He was 49th of the 55 wanted.

He is suspected of being linked to insurgency operations against the Iraqi government and the Americans, and the American government has allocated a reward of one million dollars to anyone who helps arrest him.

He is accused of carrying out criminal operations in Diyala province.

The Iraqi government announced his arrest in 2006,  though the BBC says he is still on the run.

References

External links

Members of the Regional Command of the Arab Socialist Ba'ath Party – Iraq Region
Possibly living people
Year of birth missing
Most-wanted Iraqi playing cards